Tak is a town (thesaban mueang) in north-west Thailand, capital of the Tak Province and the Tak district.  As of 2005 the town had a population of 19,900 and an area of 7.27 km². It covers the tambon Rahaeng, Nong Luang, Chiang Ngoen, and Hua Diat. It is on the Ping River, 418 km north-north-west of Bangkok.

Geography
Tak is on the Ping River, which runs from north to south through the town. While the land to the east is fairly flat, the Tenasserim Hills and Dawna Range lie to the west.

Climate
Tak has a tropical savanna climate (Köppen climate classification Aw). Winters are dry and very warm. The monsoon season runs from May through October, with heavy rain and somewhat cooler temperatures during the day, although nights remain warm.

Transportation
Route 105, through Mae Sot, forms one of two major transnational roads through the Tenasserim Hills to Burma. Route 1, also known as the Phahonyothin Road, passes through Tak. On the north side it leads to Lampang, Chiang Rai, and the border with Burma at Mae Sai. On the south side it leads to Kamphaeng Phet, Nakhon Sawan, and Bangkok. Route 12 leads east to Sukhothai, Phitsanulok, Chum Phae, Khon Kaen, Kalasin, and the border with Laos at Mukdahan.

References

External links

 
 Website of town (Thai)

Populated places in Tak province
Cities and towns in Thailand